Sogamoso is a city in the department of Boyacá of Colombia. It is the capital of the Sugamuxi Province, named after the original Sugamuxi. Sogamoso is nicknamed "City of the Sun", based on the original Muisca tradition of pilgrimage and adoring their Sun god Sué at the Sun Temple.

Etymology 
Sogamoso is named after Sugamuxi or Suamox, the original name in Chibcha for the city and Sugamuxi, the last iraca of the sacred City of the Sun. Suamuxi means "Dwelling of the Sun". Knowledge about Sugamuxi has been provided by Pedro Simón and the German countess Gertrud von Podewils Dürniz, in her work Chigys Mie.

Geographical limits 
Sogamoso limits with the following municipalities:
 north: Nobsa and Tópaga
 east: Tópaga, Monguí and Aquitania - 3030 m
 south: Aquitania, Cuítiva and Iza
 west: Tibasosa, Firavitoba

Climate 
Sogamoso has a temperate climate with an average temperature of 20 °C.

History 
Before the Spanish conquest, Suamox, as it was called, was ruled by the iraca of which the last ruler was called Sugamuxi. The city was a place of pilgrimage and the iraca was both priest and ruler housed in the Sun Temple, a richly ornamented temple honouring Sué, the Sun god in the Muisca religion.

Conquest and New Kingdom of Granada 

Gonzalo Jiménez de Quesada was the conquistador of the Muisca Confederation, arriving in Suamox territories (Iraca Valley) in September 1537. Soldiers of De Quesada -according to Spanish chroniclers accidentally- set the Sun Temple on fire. Lucas Fernández de Piedrahita narrates about the march of De Quesada to Suamox, the looting of the city and the fire of the temple of the Sun.

Soon after the conquest, the missionaries began the construction of a chapel that would open the way to the first Catholic church of the time, located on the central square.

Natural scientist Alexander von Humboldt who visited the New Kingdom of Granada at the beginning of the 19th century, wrote about Sogamoso in his chronicles.

Suamox in Muisca history

Administrative division 
According to the political Map – administrative Number 41ª, del Plan of Territorial Classification 1999–2010, in February of the year 2000, the city was conformed by 18 veredas:

Neighbourhoods 
Sogamoso is composed of 70 neighbourhoods.
l. Alamos del sur  2. Álvaro González Santana	3. Angelmar	4. Benjamín Herrera	5. Campoamor	6. Centro
7. Chapinero	8. Chicamocha	9. Colombia	10. El Cortez	11. El Diamante	12. El Durazno
13. El Jardín	14. El Laguito	15. El Nogal	16. El Oriente	17. El Prado	18. El Recreo
19. El Rosario	20. El Sol	21. El Carmen	22. Gustavo Jiménez Jiménez	23. Jorge Eliécer Gaitán	24. José Antonio Galán
25. Juan José Rondón	26. La Castellana	27. La Esmeralda	28. La Florida	29. La Isla	30. La Pradera
31. La Villita	32. Las Acacias	33. Las Américas	34. Los Alisos	35. Los Alpes	36. Los Arrayanes
37. Los Libertadores	38. Los Rosales	39. Los Sauces	40. Lunapark	41. Magdalena	42. Monquirá
43. Enrique Olaya Herrera	44. Prado Norte	45. Rafael Uribe Uribe	46. San Andresito	47. San Cristóbal	48. San Martín	
49. San Martín- Centro	50. Santa Ana- Mochacá	51. Santa Bárbara	52. Santa Catalina	53. Santa Helena	54. Santa Inés
55. San Rafael	56. Santa Isabel	57. Santa Marta	58. Siete de Agosto	59. Simón Bolívar	60. Sucre
61. Sugamuxi	62. Universitario	63. Rafael Valdés Tavera	64. Veinte de Julio	65. Venecia	66. Villa Blanca
67. Villa del Sol	68. Asodea	69. Villa del Lago	70. Valdez Tavera

Economy 
The economy of Sogamoso is centered around agriculture, trade, the steel industry and construction materials, and in the exploitation of limestones, marble and coal.

During the years 2007 and 2008, the city had a quick development in urban construction.

Transportation 
Sogamoso is served by Alberto Lleras Camargo Airport. Aerocivil lifted the restriction of air operations in September 2009.

Due to the increase of economic relationships with Bogotá and the rest of the region, the government realised the need to build a highway.

Education 
As of 2016, Sogamoso has seven universities:
 Sogamoso Faculty of Pedagogical and Technological University Of Colombia, Universidad Pedagógica y Tecnológica de Colombia (UPTC)
 Open National University at Distance
 University Corporation Remington
 Polytechnic Grancolombiano
 University of Pamplona
 Superior school of Public Administration E.S.A.P.
 Sogamoso Faculty of the University of Boyacá

Culture

Sites of interest 
The city hosts historical places as:
 Archaeology Museum Sogamoso, with a reconstruction of the Sun Temple
 Central park
 6 September square
 The Pile-Mochacá, from the ancient city "the old Sogamoso"
 Morca, where the Virgin Of Morca is venerated
 Nearby Lake Tota, largest lake of Colombia and sacred site of the Muisca

Festivals and celebrations 
 September 6: Anniversary of the city
 July: Festivities of the Sun and of the Steel
 Huán Festival, recreation of the indigenous ceremony of the adoration of the Sun
 September: International Festival of The Culture
 October: Festival of the corn
 October: Festival of the mud

Radio stations of Sogamoso 
 Rumba Stereo 106.1 FM
 Tropicana Stereo 107.3 FM
 Sun Stereo 99.1 FM
 RCN Basic Radio 1200 AM
 Caracol Radio 1090 AM
 RCN Antenna 2 1440 AM
 96.1 FM

Born in Sogamoso 
 Elkin Barrera, former professional cyclist
 Henry Cárdenas, former professional cyclist
 Edgar Corredor, former professional cyclist
 Camilo Gómez, professional cyclist
 Chepe González, former professional cyclist
 Luis Alfredo López, former professional cyclist
 Fabio Parra, former professional cyclist
 Humberto Parra, former professional cyclist
 Iván Parra, former professional cyclist
 Alfonso Patiño Rosselli, Colombian diplomat
 Álvaro Sierra, former professional cyclist
 Íkaro Valderrama, Latin-Siberian folk musician

Gallery

References

Further reading

External links 

  General information on Sogamoso